To Die For is a 1995 film directed by Gus Van Sant and starring Nicole Kidman.

To Die For may also refer to:

 To Die For (1989 film), also known as Dracula: The Love Story, a horror-romance film directed by Deran Sarafian
 To Die For (1994 film), a British comedy-drama film directed by Peter Mackenzie Litten

Music
 To/Die/For, a gothic metal band from the town of Kouvola in southeast of Finland
 To Die For (Integrity album), by the American hardcore band Integrity and its title track
 "To Die For" (Sam Smith song)
 "To Die For" (Luke Galliana song)

Other

 
 
 To Die For (novel), a 2004 American novel by Linda Howard
 2 Die 4, a 2009 British novel by Nigel Hinton